Sattanathapuram Venkataraman Shekher (born 26 December 1950) is an Indian actor, director, screenwriter, politician and a playwright of Tamil-language plays. In 2006, he was elected as an MLA for the All India Anna Dravida Munnetra Kazhagam (AIADMK) from Mylapore. He is the founder of Federation of Brahmin associations of South India (FEBAS). He is presently one of the spokespersons for the Bhartiya Janata Party (BJP).

Personal life
Shekher was born in a tamil family to Sattanathapuram Venkataraman on 26 December 1950. He completed his diploma in Mechanical Engineering and post diploma in Air Conditioning and Refrigeration.

Shekher is married to Uma, who is the granddaughter of G. Ramanathan, a renowned Tamil film music director during 1950s. The couple have a daughter named Anuradha and a son named Ashwin who debuted in the Tamil movie Vegam.

Career

Shekher's stage career began in 1974 when he acted in his first stage play. He entered Kollywood as a still photographer for the film Mogham. Then, was spotted by director K. Balachander who provided him a role in the film Ninaithale Inikkum and later gave him a full-fledged role in his movie Varumayin Niram Sivappu.

Back in 1973, having been inspired by his journey, when part of the Singapore drama team and also part of a popular drama team by the name 'Mylapore Boys' which were in stiff competition with the Crazy troupe, led by Crazy Mohan, went on to start his troupe, Natakhapriya, that has staged about 24 plays. His drama troupe went on to perform around the globe; Europe, UAE, Singapore, Malaysia, United States of America and South America. He went on to feature in the Limca book of Records for having produced plays throughout the day, right from the morning, 7:47 A.M until the next morning, 1.49 A.M, which accounted for eight plays altogether, in the month of April, the year 1985. His play Adhirshtakaaran went on to be directed and produced into a film, Krishna Krishna, with him playing the lead himself. Shekhar did not just curtail himself to acting and performing but went on to write as well. He has released 32 books to date that contain his story and dialogue of all his stage plays. These books also include his jokes, his views; and answers to social topics put forth to him by his fans, which caused him to once again be mentioned in the Limca Book of Records. Shekhar went on to receive a doctorate for his Theatrical and Social services by the American Tamil University. Today he stands as one of those legendary playwrights who stand along with the members of drama troupes in the United States of America. After all the hard work he invested in his passion for theater, he went on to bag the 'Iyal Isai Nataka Mandram's Kalai Maamani Award' and the 'Best Drama Troupe' Award.
Shekhar also won the Best All India Programme producer award for four consecutive years from the Radio and Television Advertisers and Producers Association - RAPA. He has not been acclaimed to be the 'Best Comedian' by just the Mylapore Academy, but also by celebrities such as Kamal Haasan, Rajinikanth and A. P. J. Abdul Kalam. He was also acclaimed to be the same by Wisdom magazine. Shekhar has also bagged the award of Tamil Nadu's prestigious Kalaivanar Award.

In 2015, S. Ve. Shekher got appointed as one of the members of Central Board of Film Certification.

Politics 
In 2006, he made an entry into politics by contesting and winning the Legislative Assembly Elections as an All India Anna Dravida Munnetra Kazhagam (AIADMK) candidate from Mylapore. He was expelled from AIADMK on 30 July 2009. He later joined the Indian National Congress. Shekher was also expelled from the party for working against the party's interests. He later joined the BJP.

He founded the Federation of Brahmin Associations of South India on 2009.

Accusations on journalists which led to protests 
S Ve Shekher shared a post on Facebook in April 2018 which allegedly accused all women journalists in Tamil Nadu of sleeping around with the top bosses to get their jobs, when a female journalist complained against Banwarilal Purohit for patting her cheek at a press conference. The cyber-crime wing of the police filed a case under 'section 4' of the Tamil Nadu Prohibition of Women Harassment on the basis of a complaint from the journalists association.

A large number of journalists protested outside the BJP office, urging that the party to take action against Shekher. Later, a small number of journalists went to Shekhar's house and proceeded to protest, some were also arrested for throwing stones at his house. Various political leaders and journalists condemned his statements.

In May 2018, the High Court of Madras denied him anticipatory bail. The police had, however, stayed away from detaining Shekher, and even after the high court had refused the bail. He has been spotted in different functions with police security. He was later granted bail in June 2018.

2020 Case for controversial speech 
On August 3, 2020, a complaint was registered against Shekher of trying to incite communal violence by making provocative statements in his Youtube channel, insulting the Indian national flag by giving it religious association and spreading misinformation against Chief minister Edappadi K. Palaniswami. This caused social condemnations with police complaint to be registered. In the video he criticized the Chief minister for opposing the three-language policy and for seeking action against those who draped saffron cloth on AIADMK founder M. G. Ramachandran. Chief Minister Palaniswami responded by saying that the ADMK party have no obligation to respond to his comments and he goes into hiding if a case if filed against him. The Central Crime Branch booked him under the National Honour Act of 1971.  In September 2020, he was forced to apologize to the court unconditionally to consider for the police to not arrest.

Plays

Filmography

References

External links
 Official website of S Ve Shekher

Living people
Indian male film actors
Tamil male actors
Tamil film directors
Tamil screenwriters
Tamil dramatists and playwrights
Tamil Nadu politicians
Tamil comedians
1950 births
All India Anna Dravida Munnetra Kazhagam politicians
Indian male comedians
Indian male screenwriters
Male actors from Tamil Nadu
Indian actor-politicians
20th-century Indian male actors
Indian male dramatists and playwrights
20th-century Indian dramatists and playwrights
Dramatists and playwrights from Tamil Nadu
20th-century Indian male writers